The 2003–04 Wisconsin Badgers women's ice hockey team was the Badgers' 4th season. Head coach Mark Johnson was in his first season as Badgers head coach.

Regular season
Senior Meghan Hunter finished her Badgers career as the all-time career goals scored leader (since broken) with 84 goals. She also finished as the Badgers all-time career leader in assists (since broken) with 93.

Schedule

Awards and honors
Sara Bauer, All-WCHA, Second Team
Sara Bauer, WCHA Rookie of the Year
Sara Bauer, WCHA All-Rookie Team
Christine Dufour, WCHA All-Rookie Team
Molly Engstrom, WCHA Defensive Player of the Year 
Molly Engstrom, All–WCHA, First Team
 Meghan Horras, All-WCHA, Second Team
 Meghan Horras, WCHA Goaltending Champion
 Meghan Horras, USCHO.com Player of the Week, Nov. 18, 2003
 Carla MacLeod, AHCA All-Americans, Second team
 Carla MacLeod, All-WCHA, Second Team
 Carla MacLeod, USCHO.com Player of the Week, February 10, 2004
Bobbi Jo Slusar, WCHA All-Rookie Team

WCHA Rookie of the Week
Sara Bauer, Mar. 2, 2004
Sara Bauer, Mar. 9, 2004
Christine Dufour, Nov. 10, 2003
Lindsay Macy, Feb. 23, 2004
 Meaghan Mikkelson, Oct 13, 2003
 Meaghan Mikkelson, March 8, 2004

WCHA Player of the Week
Nikki Burish, Nov. 24, 2003
Meghan Horras, Jan. 19, 2004
Meghan Horras, Feb. 16, 2004
Carla MacLeod, Nov. 17, 2003
Carla MacLeod, Feb. 9, 2004
Karen Rickard, Nov. 10, 2003
Karen Rickard, March 1, 2004

Academic Awards
Nikki Burish, Academic All-WCHA
Nikki Burish, Academic All-Big Ten
Sharon Cole, Academic All-WCHA
Sharon Cole, Academic All-Big Ten
Sharon Cole, UW Athletic Board Scholars
Leah Federman, Academic All-Big Ten
Kathryn Greaves, Academic All-WCHA
 Leah Federman, Academic All-Big Ten
Stephanie Millar, Academic All-WCHA
Stephanie Millar, Academic All-Big Ten
Nicole Uliasz, Academic All-WCHA
Nicole Uliasz, Academic All-Big Ten
Amy Vermeulen, Academic All-WCHA
Amy Vermeulen, Academic All-Big Ten

Team Awards
Sara Bauer, Rookie of the Year
Sara Bauer, Offensive Player of the Year
Molly Engstrom, Badger Award (known as Most Inspirational Player award)
Molly Engstrom, Defensive Player of the Year
Kathryn Greaves, W Club Community Service Award
Meghan Hunter and Karen Rickard, Jeff Sauer Award (Presented to the player who consistently demonstrates dedication to her teammates)

References

Wisconsin
Wisconsin Badgers women's ice hockey seasons
Wiscon
Wiscon